Guilherme Bissoli Campos (born 9 January 1998) is a Brazilian professional footballer Atualmente joga no Athletico Paranaense

Club career

São Paulo
Bissoli joined the youth academy of São Paulo FC in 2009. He emerged as the top scorer of the 2015 Campeonato Paulista under-17 with 22 goals. In 2016, he won the under-20 Paulista, under-20 RS Cup, and under-20 Copa do Brasil.

In November 2017, Bissoli was called to the senior team along with three other youth team players for a league match against Coritiba as replacements for injured first team players. On 3 December 2017, he made his first team league debut, replacing Brenner in a 1–1 draw against Bahia. At the end of the 2017 season, he was promoted to the first team.

Athletico Paranaense
In June 2018, Bissoli agreed to a pre-contract with Athletico Paranaense, effective as of the following January. In February 2019, after his contract expired, he was assigned to Paraguayan proxy club Fernando de la Mora, only joining Athletico in January 2020 on loan until the end of the season.

Transfer controversy
In January 2020, São Paulo's Football Executive manager Alexandre Pássaro stated that the club would seek to initiate an investigation on Bissoli's signing for Athletico, saying that "If we offer a certain contract and another club offers the same or even a bigger one, São Paulo can cover the offer, and the player is obliged to stay. A year ago, we had this exact episode with Athletico-PR, who made an offer for Bissoli. We matched, they increased, we matched again, and he stayed here." Bissoli, however, refused to stay at São Paulo, and left the club when his contract expired in February 2019.

Personal life
Bissoli's father Celinho also played youth football for São Paulo (never reaching higher than the under-20 level).

Career statistics
.

Honours
Athletico Paranaense
Campeonato Paranaense: 2020
Copa Sudamericana: 2021

References

External links

1998 births
Living people
Footballers from São Paulo (state)
Association football forwards
Brazilian footballers
Campeonato Brasileiro Série A players
Campeonato Brasileiro Série B players
São Paulo FC players
Fernando de la Mora footballers
Club Athletico Paranaense players
Cruzeiro Esporte Clube players
People from Jaú